Efly was an airline based in Malta. It operated commercial, charter and ad-hoc flights. It briefly operated a route between Malta and Catania, Sicily, with hopes to provide a luxury service at low cost.

History
Efly was a low-cost carrier established by Luigi Crisipino and fellow business partners, to provide luxurious, low cost flights with service to several destinations throughout Europe, beginning with London's Gatwick Airport.

The airline leased four aircraft, but only one aircraft was delivered to the airline in Malta. The airline failed to obtain its license to operate as a commercial airline, but it could fly its sole aircraft. In September 2009, weeks after Luigi Crisipino's resignation, the airline began operations operating an inaugural flight of 56 passengers.

On November 5, 2009, the airline ceased operations due to tough competition on its Malta-Catania route, and struggles with entry permits and vehicle ramp access at Malta International Airport.

Destinations
Former destinations that Efly flew to (as of October 22, 2009):

Europe
Malta
Malta (Malta International Airport)
Italy
Catania (Catania Fontanarossa Airport)

Flights to these destinations were ceased on November 5, 2009, and clients’ whose flights were cancelled received full reimbursement.

Fleet
The Efly fleet included the following aircraft (as of 22 October 2009): 

1 BAe 146-300, registered 9H-ELE

This aircraft was returned to its lessor, and is currently in storage.

References

External links 
Official website
Efly fleet

Defunct airlines of Malta
Airlines established in 2009
Airlines disestablished in 2009
2009 establishments in Malta
2009 disestablishments in Malta